The 1983 Algerian Cup Final was the 21st final of the Algerian Cup. The final took place on May 20th, 1983, at Stade 5 Juillet 1962 in Algiers with kick-off at 19:00. MP Alger beat ASC Oran 4-3 after extra time to win their fourth Algerian Cup.

Pre-match

Details

References

Cup
Algeria
Algerian Cup Finals
USM Alger matches